This article shows all participating team squads at the 2021 Men's European Volleyball Championship, held in Poland, Czech Republic, Estonia and Finland from 1 to 19 September 2021.

Pool A

Belgium

The following is Belgium roster in the 2021 European Championship.

Head coach: Fernando Muñoz

1 Bram Van Den Dries 
2 Hendrik Tuerlinckx 
3 Sam Deroo 
4 Stijn D'Hulst 
7 Lennert Van Elsen 
8 Arno Van De Velde 
9 Wout D'Heer 
12 Matthijs Verhanneman 
13 Elias Thys 
14 Jelle Ribbens 
16 Matthias Valkiers 
17 Tomas Rousseaux 
20 Mathijs Desmet 
26 Martin Perin

Greece

The following is Greece roster in the 2021 European Championship.

Head coach: Dimitrios Andreopoulos

1 Dimitrios Zisis 
2 Georgios Papalexiou 
3 Nikos Zoupani 
6 Konstantinos Stivachtis 
7 Giorgos Petreas 
9 Menelaos Kokkinakis 
10 Rafail Koumentakis 
11 Stavros Kasampalis 
12 Theodoros Voulkidis 
13 Charalampos Andreopoulos 
15 Alexandros Raptis 
19 Dimitrios Mouchlias 
22 Dimosthenis Linardos 
77 Athanasios Protopsaltis

Poland

The following is Poland roster in the 2021 European Championship.

Head coach: Vital Heynen

1 Piotr Nowakowski 
5 Łukasz Kaczmarek 
6 Bartosz Kurek 
9 Wilfredo León 
10 Damian Wojtaszek 
11 Fabian Drzyzga 
12 Grzegorz Łomacz 
13 Michał Kubiak 
14 Aleksander Śliwka 
15 Jakub Kochanowski 
16 Kamil Semeniuk 
17 Paweł Zatorski 
20 Mateusz Bieniek 
21 Tomasz Fornal

Portugal

The following is Portugal roster in the 2021 European Championship.

Head coach: Hugo Silva

1 Miguel Sinfronio 
2 Gil Pereira 
3 André Lopes 
4 Filip Cveticanin 
5 André Marques 
6 Alexandre Ferreira 
7 Ivo Casas 
8 Tiago Violas 
9 Marco Ferreira 
10 Phelipe Martins 
12 Lourenço Martins 
15 Miguel Tavares 
17 José Andrade 
18 Hugo Gaspar

Serbia

The following is Serbia roster in the 2021 European Championship.

Head coach: Slobodan Kovač

1 Aleksandar Okolić 
2 Uroš Kovačević 
4 Nemanja Petrić 
6 Nikola Peković 
7 Petar Krsmanović 
8 Marko Ivović 
9 Nikola Jovović 
12 Pavle Perić 
14 Aleksandar Atanasijević 
16 Dražen Luburić 
17 Neven Majstorović 
18 Marko Podraščanin 
20 Srećko Lisinac 
21 Vuk Todorović

Ukraine

The following is Ukraine roster in the 2021 European Championship.

Head coach: Uģis Krastiņš

3 Dmytro Viietskyi 
5 Oleh Plotnytskyi 
6 Maksym Drozd 
7 Horden Brova 
8 Dmytro Teryomenko 
9 Volodymyr Ostapenko 
10 Yurii Semeniuk 
11 Vladyslav Didenko 
12 Denys Fomin 
14 Illia Kovalov 
15 Vitalii Shchytkov 
17 Tymofii Poluian 
18 Yan Yereshchenko 
20 Volodymyr Sydorenko

Pool B

Belarus

The following is Belarus roster in the 2021 European Championship. 

Head coach: Viktar Beksha

3 Petr Lazuka 
6 Uladzislau Babkevich 
8 Artsem Masko 
13 Ilya Burau 
14 Vadzim Pranko 
15 Kanstantsin Tsiushkevich 
17 Radzivon Miskevich 
18 Maksim Shkredau 
19 Kanstantsin Panasenko 
20 Maksim Budziukhin 
21 Aliaksei Kurash 
27 Ilya Marozau 
29 Uladzislau Davyskiba

Bulgaria

The following is Bulgaria roster in the 2021 European Championship.

Head coach: Silvano Prandi

1 Velizar Chernokozhev 
2 Stefan Chavdarov 
3 Nikolay Kolev 
4 Martin Atanasov 
5 Svetoslav Gotsev 
6 Vladimir Stankov 
8 Todor Skrimov 
9 Georgi Seganov 
11 Aleks Grozdanov 
14 Asparuh Asparuhov 
15 Gordan Lyutskanov 
16 Vladislav Ivanov 
19 Tsvetan Sokolov 
24 Martin Ivanov

Czech Republic

The following is Czech Republic roster in the 2021 European Championship.

Head coach: Jiří Novák

1 Milan Moník 
2 Jan Hadrava 
3 Daniel Pfeffer 
5 Adam Zajíček 
6 Michal Finger 
9 Vojtěch Patočka 
12 Martin Licek 
13 Jan Galabov 
14 Adam Bartoš 
15 Lukáš Vašina 
18 Jakub Janouch 
19 Luboš Bartůněk 
22 Oliver Sedláček 
25 Josef Polák

Italy

The following is Italy roster in the 2021 European Championship.

Head coach: Ferdinando De Giorgi

6 Simone Giannelli 
7 Fabio Balaso 
14 Gianluca Galassi 
15 Riccardo Sbertoli 
16 Yuri Romanò 
17 Simone Anzani 
18 Alessandro Michieletto 
19 Daniele Lavia 
21 Alessandro Piccinelli 
22 Fabio Ricci 
23 Giulio Pinali 
26 Lorenzo Cortesia 
28 Francesco Recine 
29 Mattia Bottolo

Montenegro

The following is Montenegro roster in the 2021 European Championship.

Head coach: Veljko Basić

1 Aleksandar Minić 
3 Luka Babić 
4 Ivan Zvicer 
5 Rajko Strugar 
6 Vojin Ćaćić 
7 Nikola Lakčević 
12 Matija Ćinćur 
13 Blažo Milić 
14 Marko Vukašinović 
17 Ivan Ječmenica 
18 Miloš Ćulafić 
18 Nemanja Peruničić 
20 Milutin Pavićević 
22 Danilo Dubak

Slovenia

The following is Slovenia roster in the 2021 European Championship.

Head coach: Alberto Giuliani

1 Tonček Štern 
2 Alen Pajenk 
4 Jan Kozamernik 
5 Alen Šket 
9 Dejan Vinčić 
10 Sašo Štalekar 
11 Žiga Štern 
12 Jan Klobučar 
13 Jani Kovačič 
15 Matic Videčnik 
16 Gregor Ropret 
17 Tine Urnaut 
18 Klemen Čebulj 
19 Rok Možič

Pool C

Finland

The following is Finland roster in the 2021 European Championship.

Head coach: Joel Banks

1 Antti Ronkainen 
2 Eemi Tervaportti 
3 Mikko Esko 
4 Lauri Kerminen 
6 Niklas Seppänen 
7 Niko Suihkonen 
8 Voitto Köykkä 
9 Tommi Siirilä 
10 Urpo Sivula 
11 Sauli Sinkkonen 
12 Aaro Nikula 
13 Joonas Jokela 
18 Miki Jauhiainen 
23 Antti Sakari Mäkinen

Netherlands

The following is Netherlands roster in the 2021 European Championship.

Head coach: Roberto Piazza

2 Wessel Keemink 
4 Thijs ter Horst 
5 Luuc van der Ent 
6 Just Dronkers 
7 Gijs Jorna 
8 Fabian Plak 
12 Bennie Tuinstra 
13 Steven Ottevanger 
14 Nimir Abdel-Aziz 
16 Wouter ter Maat 
17 Michaël Parkinson 
18 Robbert Andringa 
19 Freek de Weijer 
22 Twan Wiltenburg

North Macedonia

The following is North Macedonia roster in the 2021 European Championship.

Head coach: Duško Nikolić

1 Darko Angelovski 
2 Gjorgi Gjorgiev 
4 Nikola Gjorgiev 
5 Vlado Milev 
7 Slave Nakov 
8 Aleksandar Ljaftov 
11 Filip Despotovski 
12 Filip Nikolovski 
15 Filip Madjunkov 
16 Stojan Iliev 
17 Luka Kostikj 
18 Vase Mihailov 
19 Risto Nikolov 
20 Filip Savovski

Russia

The following is Russia roster in the 2021 European Championship.

Head coach: Tuomas Sammelvuo

1 Yaroslav Podlesnykh 
2 Ilia Vlasov 
4 Artem Volvich 
6 Evgeny Baranov 
7 Dmitry Volkov 
8 Pavel Tetyukhin 
9 Ivan Iakovlev 
11 Pavel Pankov 
18 Egor Kliuka 
20 Ilyas Kurkaev 
23 Kirill Klets 
24 Igor Kobzar 
25 Fedor Voronkov 
27 Valentin Golubev

Spain

The following is Spain roster in the 2021 European Championship.

Head coach: Ricardo Maldonado

1 Augusto Colito 
3 Víctor Rodríguez Pérez 
5 Rubén Lorente 
6 Borja Ruiz 
7 Jordi Ramón Ferragut 
9 Alejandro Vigil 
10 Daniel Ruiz Posadas 
11 Unai Larrañaga Ledo 
13 Andrés Villena 
14 Miguel Ángel Fornés 
15 Francisco Iribarne 
19 Emilio Ferrández Moles 
20 Álvaro Gimeno Rubio 
27 Ángel Trinidad

Turkey

The following is Turkey roster in the 2021 European Championship.

Head coach: Nedim Özbey

1 Ramazan Mandiraci 
4 Beytullah Hatipoğlu 
5 Baturalp Burak Güngör 
7 Vahit Emre Savaş 
10 Murat Yenipazar 
11 Yiğit Gülmezoğlu 
12 Adis Lagumdzija 
13 Oğuzhan Karasu 
16 Oğulcan Yatgın 
20 Efe Bayram 
22 Mert Matić 
24 Mirza Lagumdzija 
30 Caner Ergül 
77 Bedirhan Bülbül

Pool D

Croatia

The following is Croatia roster in the 2021 European Championship.

Head coach: Emanuele Zanini

1 Tsimafei Zhukouski 
2 Bernard Bakonji 
3 Dominik Brčić 
4 Tino Hanžić 
5 Tomislav Mitrašinović 
6 Ivan Raič 
7 Marko Sedlaček 
8 Sven Sarčević 
9 Sandro Dukić 
10 Filip Šestan 
13 Hrvoje Pervan 
16 Leo Andrić 
19 Ivan Zeljković 
20 Kruno Nikačević

Estonia

The following is Estonia roster in the 2021 European Championship.

Head coach: Cédric Énard

2 Renet Vanker 
3 Karli Allik 
4 Ardo Kreek 
7 Renee Teppan 
8 Märt Tammearu 
9 Robert Täht 
10 Silver Maar 
11 Oliver Venno 
12 Kristo Kollo 
14 Rait Rikberg 
16 Robert Viiber 
17 Timo Tammemaa 
19 Andri Aganits 
24 Albert Hurt

France

The following is France roster in the 2021 European Championship.

Head coach: Bernardo Rezende

1 Barthélémy Chinenyeze 
2 Jenia Grebennikov 
4 Jean Patry 
6 Benjamin Toniutti 
9 Earvin N'Gapeth 
11 Antoine Brizard 
14 Nicolas Le Goff 
16 Daryl Bultor 
17 Trévor Clévenot 
19 Yacine Louati 
20 Benjamin Diez 
21 Théo Faure 
24 Moussé Gueye 
28 François Rebeyrol

Germany

The following is Germany roster in the 2021 European Championship.

Head coach: Andrea Giani

1 Christian Fromm 
2 Johannes Tille 
3 Ruben Schott 
5 Moritz Reichert 
6 Denis Kaliberda 
9 György Grozer 
10 Julian Zenger 
12 Anton Brehme 
14 Moritz Karlitzek 
17 Jan Zimmermann 
18 Florian Krage 
20 Linus Weber 
21 Tobias Krick 
23 Yannick Goralek

Latvia

The following is Latvia roster in the 2021 European Championship.

Head coach: Avo Keel

1 Ingars Ivanovs 
4 Toms Svans 
7 Romāns Saušs 
8 Kristaps Šmits 
9 Hermans Egleskalns 
11 Deniss Petrovs 
12 Edvarts Buivids 
13 Edvīns Skrūders 
14 Gustavs Freimanis 
15 Artems Petrovs 
16 Kristaps Platačs 
17 Atvars Ozoliņš 
19 Kristers Dardzans 
22 Renārs Pauls Jansons

Slovakia

The following is Slovakia roster in the 2021 European Championship.

Head coach: Marek Kardoš

1 Peter Michalovič 
2 Tomáš Kriško 
5 Luboš Němec 
6 Filip Palgut 
7 Michal Zeman 
8 Peter Ondrovič 
9 Patrik Pokopec 
10 Filip Mačuha 
11 Martin Turis 
12 Matej Paták 
14 Šimon Krajčovič 
19 Filip Gavenda 
22 Julius Firkal 
24 Samuel Goč

See also
 2021 Women's European Volleyball Championship squads

References

External links 

E
Men's European Volleyball Championship